John Conmy (10 February 1843 – 26 August 1911) was an Irish prelate who served as Bishop of Killala.

He was born in Corbally, County Mayo. Conwy was ordained priest on 10 January 1866. Conmy was appointed titular bishop of Germanicopolis on 25 May 1892; and Diocesan Bishop of Killala on 27 November 1911.

References

Roman Catholic bishops of Killala
20th-century Roman Catholic bishops in Ireland
19th-century Roman Catholic bishops in Ireland
1843 births
1911 deaths
People from County Mayo